Sangassou orthohantavirus (SANGV) is single-stranded, negative-sense RNA virus species of the genus Orthohantavirus in the Bunyavirales order. It was first isolated in an African wood mouse (Hylomyscus simus) in the forest in Guinea, West Africa in 2010. It is named for the village near where the mouse was trapped. It is the first indigenous Murinae-associated African hantavirus to be discovered.

Genome
The virus genome consists of three segments of negative-stranded RNA; the large (L) segment encodes the viral RNA-dependent RNA polymerase, the medium (M) segment encodes the envelope glycoproteins Gn and Gc (cotranslationally cleaved from a glycoprotein precursor), and the small (S) segment encodes the nucleocapsid (N) protein.

Renal syndrome
In rodents, hantavirus produces a chronic infection with no adverse sequelae. In humans, hantavirus produces two major clinical syndromes: hemorrhagic fever or pulmonary syndrome. European, Asian, and African rodent-borne hantaviruses cause hemorrhagic fever. The pulmonary syndrome, caused by the species Sin Nombre orthohantavirus,  where deer mice are the natural hosts. It was discovered in 1993 during an outbreak in the Four Corners region of the southwestern United States.

Reservoirs
Natural reservoirs for this hantavirus species include the slit faced bat, moles, and shrews. Rodent-borne hantaviruses form three major evolutionary clades corresponding to the subfamilies of their rodent hosts. HTNV, SEOV, and DOBV are examples of Murinae-associated hantaviruses. PUUV and Tula orthohantavirus (TULV) belong to the Arvicolinae-associated hantaviruses, and SNV and ANDV are representatives of Neotominae- and Sigmodontinae-associated hantaviruses.

See also
 Orthohantavirus
 Murinae

References

External links
 Sloan Science and Film / Short Films / Muerto Canyon by Jen Peel 29 minutes
 CDC's Hantavirus Technical Information Index page
 Viralzone: Hantavirus
 Virus Pathogen Database and Analysis Resource (ViPR): Bunyaviridae
 Occurrences and deaths in North and South America

Viral diseases
Hantaviridae
Hemorrhagic fevers
Rodent-carried diseases
Biological weapons